Victoria Garcia Wilburn is an American occupational therapist and politician serving as member of the Indiana House of Representatives for the 32nd district. She assumed office on November 9, 2022.

Education 
Wilburn earned a Bachelor of Science degree in occupational therapy from Boston University, followed by a Master of Health Science and Doctor of Health Science from the University of Indianapolis.

Career 
Wilburn worked as an adjunct professor at the University of Indianapolis from 2012 and 2014 and as an assistant professor and academic fieldwork coordinator from 2014 to 2016. She was a visiting professor in the Department of Occupational Therapy at Indiana University–Purdue University Indianapolis in 2017 and became an assistant professor in 2018. Wilburn was elected to the Indiana House of Representatives in November 2022.

References 

Living people
Indiana Democrats
Members of the Indiana House of Representatives
Women state legislators in Indiana
People from Indianapolis
Politicians from Indianapolis
Boston University alumni
University of Indianapolis alumni
University of Indianapolis faculty
Indiana University–Purdue University Indianapolis faculty
Year of birth missing (living people)